Jamion Christian (born April 18, 1982) is an American college basketball coach, who was most recently the head coach of the George Washington Colonials men's basketball team. He previously was the head coach at Siena and Mount St. Mary's.

Biography 
Christian was born and raised in Quinton, Virginia. As a shooting guard, he led New Kent High School to a Virginia High School League State Championship with a 26–0 record and earned the VHSL Group A State Player of the Year honors. Christian then became a shooting guard and a three-year captain for Mount St. Mary's under head coaches Jim Phelan and Milan Brown. Christian has a strong pedigree in athletics, Christian's father, John, was a standout track athlete at Virginia State University. The elder Christian is in the Virginia State University Hall of Fame and is a retired Head Coach of the Charles City High School Track & Field team. His mother was middle school teacher for New Kent County.

His brother Jarell Christian, is currently the Head Coach of the Maine Celtics in the NBA G League.

Assistant coaching career 
Christian began his coaching career as an assistant at Emory and Henry College (2004–06), Bucknell (2006–08) and then William & Mary (2008–11). While with Coach Shaver and the Tribe, Christian recruited two of the most successful players in Tribe history: Brandon Britt and Marcus Thornton.

Christian then served as an assistant at Virginia Commonwealth (2011–12) under head coach Shaka Smart, helping the Rams to the third round of the 2012 NCAA tournament after upsetting #5 seed Wichita State in the 2nd round. Coach Christian also helped the rams to a 2012 CAA Tournament championship and finished 2011–12 season with the most wins in school history (29).

Head coaching career 
Mount St. Mary's hired Christian as head coach on March 26, 2012. Christian implemented an up-tempo offense and “mayhem” defense, comparable to VCU's "havoc" defense popularized by Shaka Smart. After his first season at the helm, Christian was named finalist for the 2013 Joe B. Hall Award, presented to the top first-year head coach in Division 1.

During the 2012–13 season, the Mountaineers qualified for the NEC tournament. As a No. 5 seed, Mount St. Mary's upset Bryant and Robert Morris, but lost to Long Island University in the championship game. During the 2013–14 season, the Mountaineers won the NEC tournament and earned an automatic bid to the NCAA tournament, their first appearance since 2008.

Christian was also responsible for overseeing development of Rashad Whack (2014 NEC Tournament MVP and 2nd Team All-NEC; 2013 NEC All-Tournament Team), Julian Norfleet (2014 NEC All-Tournament Team and 2nd Team All-NEC), Sam Prescott (2014 NEC All-Tournament Team) and Shivaughn Wiggins (2013 NEC Rookie of the Year and CollegeInsider.com Mid-Major Freshman of the Year).

On May 2, 2018, Christian replaced Jimmy Patsos as the head coach at Siena. He guided the Saints to a nine-win turnaround from the previous year, finishing 17–16 overall and 11–7 in MAAC play, and a second place finish. It would be his only season on the job as he accepted the head coaching position at George Washington on March 21, 2019. Christian was fired from George Washington on March 14, 2022, after three seasons.

Head coaching record

References

1982 births
Living people
American men's basketball coaches
American men's basketball players
Basketball coaches from Virginia
Basketball players from Virginia
College men's basketball head coaches in the United States
George Washington Colonials men's basketball coaches
Mount St. Mary's Mountaineers men's basketball coaches
Mount St. Mary's Mountaineers men's basketball players
People from New Kent County, Virginia
Siena Saints men's basketball coaches
VCU Rams men's basketball coaches
William & Mary Tribe men's basketball coaches
Shooting guards